Phillip Russell Jungman (born June 11, 1995 in Bryan, Texas) is an American sport shooter. He represented the United States at the 2020 Summer Olympics in Tokyo where he placed 15th with a score of 120 targets out of a possible 125. His notable accomplishments include:
National Champion in 2016, Rio de Janeiro Olympic Alternate, Fourth place finish at 2019 Pan American Games.

Jungman is a sergeant in the United States Army. He is a competitive shooter/instructor for the shotgun team of the Army Marksmanship Unit.

References

1995 births
Living people
American military Olympians
American male sport shooters
Shooters at the 2020 Summer Olympics
Olympic shooters of the United States
People from Bryan, Texas
United States Army non-commissioned officers
United States Army reservists
20th-century American people
21st-century American people